Ngaire Pigram  is an Australian actress. For her performance in the second series of Mystery Road she was nominated for the 2020 AACTA Award for Best Guest or Supporting Actress in a Television Drama. Other screen performances include Sweet As, Firebite and Mad Bastards. Stage performances include multiple runs of Sapphires, Bran Nue Dae and Cut the Sky.

Pigram is a Yawuru woman and is the daughter of Stephen Pigram.

References

External links
 

 
Living people
Australian film actresses
Australian television actresses
Australian stage actresses
Indigenous Australian actresses